WPL, or wpl, may refer to:

In sport
 Women's Premier League (cricket)
 Welsh Premier League
 FA Women's Premier League
 Women's Premier League (WPL Rugby)
 World Pool League

In businesses and organizations
 Winnipeg Public Library in Winnipeg, Canada
 Waterloo Public Library in Waterloo, Ontario, Canada
 Wisconsin Power and Light Company, a subsidiary of Alliant Energy
 Wool Products Labeling, an obsolete ID system, replaced with Registered Identification Number

In politics and government
 Women Political Leaders, a grouping of female political leaders at national and supranational level
 Workplace Parking Levy, a local tax on companies providing car parking for employees allowed for in UK law

In transport
 The William Preston Lane Jr. Memorial Bridge, also known as the Chesapeake Bay Bridge, in Maryland, US
 WPL, the IATA code for Powell Lake Water Aerodrome in British Columbia, Canada
 WPL, the National Rail code for Worplesdon railway station in Surrey, UK

In science and technology
 Windows Media Player Playlist, a computer file format that stores multimedia playlists

See also